The Church of the Holy Sepulchre is a church in the Christian Quarter of the Old City of Jerusalem.
According to traditions dating back to the 4th century, it contains two sites considered holy in Christianity: the site where Jesus was crucified, at a place known as Calvary or Golgotha, and Jesus's empty tomb, which is where he was buried and resurrected. Each time the church was rebuilt, some of the antiquities from the preceding structure were used in the newer renovation. The tomb itself is enclosed by a 19th-century shrine called the Aedicule. The Status Quo, an understanding between religious communities dating to 1757, applies to the site.

Within the church proper are the last four stations of the Cross of the Via Dolorosa, representing the final episodes of the Passion of Jesus. The church has been a major Christian pilgrimage destination since its creation in the 4th century, as the traditional site of the resurrection of Christ, thus its original Greek name, Church of the Anastasis ('Resurrection').

Control of the church itself is shared among several Christian denominations and secular entities in complicated arrangements essentially unchanged for over 160 years, and some for much longer. The main denominations sharing property over parts of the church are the Roman Catholic, Greek Orthodox and Armenian Apostolic, and to a lesser degree the Coptic, Syriac, and Ethiopian Orthodox churches.

Name
The Church of the Holy Sepulchre; is also called the Church of the Resurrection or Church of the Anastasis by Eastern Christians.

History

Background
Following the siege of Jerusalem in AD 70 during the First Jewish–Roman War, Jerusalem had been reduced to ruins. In AD 130, the Roman emperor Hadrian began the building of a Roman colony, the new city of Aelia Capitolina, on the site. Circa AD 135, he ordered that a cave containing a rock-cut tomb be filled in to create a flat foundation for a temple dedicated to Jupiter or Venus. The temple remained until the early 4th century.

Construction (4th century)
After allegedly seeing a vision of a cross in the sky in 312, Constantine the Great began to favor Christianity, signed the Edict of Milan legalising the religion, and sent his mother, Helena, to Jerusalem to look for Christ's tomb. With the help of Bishop of Caesarea Eusebius and Bishop of Jerusalem Macarius, three crosses were found near a tomb; one which allegedly cured people of death was presumed to be the True Cross Jesus was crucified on, leading the Romans to believe that they had found Calvary. Constantine ordered in about 326 that the temple to Jupiter/Venus be replaced by a church. After the temple was torn down and its ruins removed, the soil was removed from the cave, revealing a rock-cut tomb that Helena and Macarius identified as the burial site of Jesus. A shrine was built, enclosing the rock tomb walls within its own.

In 327, Constantine and Helena separately commissioned the Church of the Nativity in Bethlehem to commemorate the birth of Jesus.

The Church of the Holy Sepulchre, planned by the architect Zenobius, was built as separate constructs over the two holy sites: a rotunda called the Anastasis ("Resurrection"), where Helena and Macarius believed Jesus to have been buried, and across a courtyard to the east, the great basilica (also known as "Martyrium"), an enclosed colonnaded atrium (the Triportico) with the traditional site of Calvary in one corner.
The church was consecrated on 13 September 335.
The Church Of The Holy Sepulchre site has been recognized since early in the 4th century as the place where Jesus was crucified, buried, and rose from the dead.

Damage and destruction (614–1009)

This building was destroyed by a fire in May of AD 614, when the Sassanid Empire, under Khosrau II, invaded Jerusalem and captured the True Cross. In 630, the Emperor Heraclius rebuilt the church after recapturing the city. After Jerusalem came under Islamic rule, it remained a Christian church, with the early Muslim rulers protecting the city's Christian sites, prohibiting their destruction or use as living quarters. A story reports that the caliph Umar ibn al-Khattab visited the church and stopped to pray on the balcony, but at the time of prayer, turned away from the church and prayed outside. He feared that future generations would misinterpret this gesture, taking it as a pretext to turn the church into a mosque. Eutychius of Alexandria adds that Umar wrote a decree saying that Muslims would not inhabit this location. The building suffered severe damage from an earthquake in 746.

Early in the 9th century, another earthquake damaged the dome of the Anastasis. The damage was repaired in 810 by Patriarch Thomas I. In 841, the church suffered a fire. In 935, the Christians prevented the construction of a Muslim mosque adjacent to the Church. In 938, a new fire damaged the inside of the basilica and came close to the rotunda. In 966, due to a defeat of Muslim armies in the region of Syria, a riot broke out, which was followed by reprisals. The basilica was burned again. The doors and roof were burnt, and Patriarch John VII was murdered.

On 18 October 1009, Fatimid caliph al-Hakim bi-Amr Allah ordered the complete destruction of the church as part of a more general campaign against Christian places of worship in Palestine and Egypt. The damage was extensive, with few parts of the early church remaining, and the roof of the rock-cut tomb damaged; the original shrine was destroyed. Some partial repairs followed. Christian Europe reacted with shock and expulsions of Jews, serving as an impetus to later Crusades.

Reconstruction (11th century)
In wide-ranging negotiations between the Fatimids and the Byzantine Empire in 1027–28, an agreement was reached whereby the new Caliph Ali az-Zahir (al-Hakim's son) agreed to allow the rebuilding and redecoration of the church. The rebuilding was finally completed during the tenures of Emperor Constantine IX Monomachos and Patriarch Nicephorus of Constantinople in 1048. As a concession, the mosque in Constantinople was reopened and the khutba sermons were to be pronounced in az-Zahir's name. Muslim sources say a by-product of the agreement was the renunciation of Islam by many Christians who had been forced to convert under al-Hakim's persecutions. In addition, the Byzantines, while releasing 5,000 Muslim prisoners, made demands for the restoration of other churches destroyed by al-Hakim and the reestablishment of a patriarch in Jerusalem. Contemporary sources credit the emperor with spending vast sums in an effort to restore the Church of the Holy Sepulchre after this agreement was made. Still, "a total replacement was far beyond available resources. The new construction was concentrated on the rotunda and its surrounding buildings: the great basilica remained in ruins."

The rebuilt church site consisted of "a court open to the sky, with five small chapels attached to it." The chapels were east of the court of resurrection (when reconstructed, the location of the tomb was under open sky), where the western wall of the great basilica had been. They commemorated scenes from the passion, such as the location of the prison of Christ and his flagellation, and presumably were so placed because of the difficulties of free movement among shrines in the city streets. The dedication of these chapels indicates the importance of the pilgrims' devotion to the suffering of Christ. They have been described as 'a sort of Via Dolorosa in miniature'... since little or no rebuilding took place on the site of the great basilica. Western pilgrims to Jerusalem during the 11th century found much of the sacred site in ruins." Control of Jerusalem, and thereby the Church of the Holy Sepulchre, continued to change hands several times between the Fatimids and the Seljuk Turks (loyal to the Abbasid caliph in Baghdad) until the Crusaders' arrival in 1099.

Crusader period (1099–1244)

Many historians maintain that the main concern of Pope Urban II, when calling for the First Crusade, was the threat to Constantinople from the Turkish invasion of Asia Minor in response to the appeal of Byzantine Emperor Alexios I Komnenos. Historians agree that the fate of Jerusalem and thereby the Church of the Holy Sepulchre was also of concern, if not the immediate goal of papal policy in 1095. The idea of taking Jerusalem gained more focus as the Crusade was underway. The rebuilt church site was taken from the Fatimids (who had recently taken it from the Abassids) by the knights of the First Crusade on 15 July 1099.

The First Crusade was envisioned as an armed pilgrimage, and no crusader could consider his journey complete unless he had prayed as a pilgrim at the Holy Sepulchre. The classical theory is that Crusader leader Godfrey of Bouillon, who became the first Latin ruler of Jerusalem, decided not to use the title "king" during his lifetime, and declared himself Advocatus Sancti Sepulchri ("Protector [or Defender] of the Holy Sepulchre"). By the Crusader period, a cistern under the former basilica was rumoured to have been where Helena had found the True Cross, and began to be venerated as such; the cistern later became the Chapel of the Invention of the Cross, but there is no evidence of the site's identification before the 11th century, and modern archaeological investigation has now dated the cistern to 11th-century repairs by Monomachos.

According to the German priest and pilgrim Ludolf von Sudheim, the keys of the Chapel of the Holy Sepulchre were in hands of the "ancient Georgians", and the food, alms, candles and oil for lamps were given to them by the pilgrims at the south door of the church.

Eight 11th- and 12th-century Crusader leaders (Godfrey, Baldwin I, Baldwin II, Fulk, Baldwin III, Amalric, Baldwin IV and Baldwin V — the first eight rulers of the Kingdom of Jerusalem) were buried in the south transept and inside the Chapel of Adam. 
The royal tombs were destroyed by the Greeks in 1809–1810. 
It is unclear if the remains of those men were exhumed; some researchers hypothesize that some of them may still be in unmarked pits under the church. 

William of Tyre, chronicler of the Crusader Kingdom of Jerusalem, reports on the renovation of the Church in the mid-12th century. The Crusaders investigated the eastern ruins on the site, occasionally excavating through the rubble, and while attempting to reach the cistern, they discovered part of the original ground level of Hadrian's temple enclosure; they transformed this space into a chapel dedicated to Helena, widening their original excavation tunnel into a proper staircase. The Crusaders began to refurnish the church in Romanesque style and added a bell tower. These renovations unified the small chapels on the site and were completed during the reign of Queen Melisende in 1149, placing all the holy places under one roof for the first time. The church became the seat of the first Latin patriarchs and the site of the kingdom's scriptorium. It was lost to Saladin, along with the rest of the city, in 1187, although the treaty established after the Third Crusade allowed Christian pilgrims to visit the site. Emperor Frederick II (r. 1220–50) regained the city and the church by treaty in the 13th century while under a ban of excommunication, with the consequence that the holiest church in Christianity was laid under interdict. The church seems to have been largely in the hands of Greek Orthodox patriarch Athanasius II of Jerusalem (c. 1231–47) during the Latin control of Jerusalem. Both city and church were captured by the Khwarezmians in 1244.

Ottoman period

There was certainly a recognisable Nestorian (Church of the East) presence at the Holy Sepulchre from the years 1348 through 1575, as contemporary Franciscan accounts indicate. The Franciscan friars renovated the church in 1555, as it had been neglected despite increased numbers of pilgrims. The Franciscans rebuilt the Aedicule, extending the structure to create an antechamber. A marble shrine commissioned by Friar Boniface of Ragusa was placed to envelop the remains of Christ's tomb, probably to prevent pilgrims from touching the original rock or taking small pieces as souvenirs. A marble slab was placed over the limestone burial bed where Jesus's body is believed to have lain.

After the renovation of 1555, control of the church oscillated between the Franciscans and the Orthodox, depending on which community could obtain a favorable firman from the "Sublime Porte" at a particular time, often through outright bribery. Violent clashes were not uncommon. There was no agreement about this question, although it was discussed at the negotiations to the Treaty of Karlowitz in 1699. During the Holy Week of 1757, Orthodox Christians reportedly took over some of the Franciscan-controlled church. This may have been the cause of the sultan's firman (decree) later developed into the Status Quo.

A fire severely damaged the structure again in 1808, causing the dome of the Rotunda to collapse and smashing the Aedicule's exterior decoration. The Rotunda and the Aedicule's exterior were rebuilt in 1809–10 by architect Nikolaos Ch. Komnenos of Mytilene in the contemporary Ottoman Baroque style. The interior of the antechamber, now known as the Chapel of the Angel, was partly rebuilt to a square ground plan in place of the previously semicircular western end.

Another decree in 1853 from the sultan solidified the existing territorial division among the communities and solidified the Status Quo for arrangements to "remain in their present state", requiring consensus to make even minor changes.

The dome was restored by Catholics, Greeks and Turks in 1868, being made of iron ever since.

British Mandate period
By the time of the British Mandate for Palestine following the end of World War I, the cladding of red marble applied to the Aedicule by Komnenos had deteriorated badly and was detaching from the underlying structure; from 1947 until restoration work in 2016–17, it was held in place with an exterior scaffolding of iron girders installed by the British authorities.

Jordanian and Israeli periods

In 1948, Jerusalem was divided between Israel and Jordan and the Old City with the church were made part of Jordan. In 1967, Israeli forces captured East Jerusalem in the Six Day War, and that area has remained under Israeli control ever since. Under Israeli rule, legal arrangements relating to the churches of East Jerusalem were maintained in coordination with the Jordanian government. The dome at the Church of the Holy Sepulchre was restored again in 1994–97 as part of extensive modern renovations that have been ongoing since 1959. During the 1970–78 restoration works and excavations inside the building, and under the nearby Muristan bazaar, it was found that the area was originally a quarry, from which white meleke limestone was struck.

Chapel of St. Vartan
East of the Chapel of Saint Helena, the excavators discovered a void containing a 2nd-century drawing of a Roman pilgrim ship, two low walls supporting the platform of Hadrian's 2nd-century temple, and a higher 4th-century wall built to support Constantine's basilica. After the excavations of the early 1970s, the Armenian authorities converted this archaeological space into the Chapel of Saint Vartan, and created an artificial walkway over the quarry on the north of the chapel, so that the new chapel could be accessed (by permission) from the Chapel of Saint Helena.

Aedicule restoration
After seven decades of being held together by steel girders, the Israel Antiquities Authority (IAA) declared the visibly deteriorating Aedicule structure unsafe. A restoration of the Aedicule was agreed upon and executed from May 2016 to March 2017. Much of the $4 million project was funded by the World Monuments Fund, as well as $1.3 million from Mica Ertegun and a significant sum from King Abdullah II of Jordan. The existence of the original limestone cave walls within the Aedicule was confirmed, and a window was created to view this from the inside. The presence of moisture led to the discovery of an underground shaft resembling an escape tunnel carved into the bedrock, seeming to lead from the tomb. For the first time since at least 1555, on 26 October 2016, marble cladding that protects the supposed burial bed of Jesus was removed. Members of the National Technical University of Athens were present. Initially, only a layer of debris was visible. This was cleared in the next day, and a partially broken marble slab with a Crusader-style cross carved was revealed. By the night of 28 October, the original limestone burial bed was shown to be intact. The tomb was resealed shortly thereafter. Mortar from just above the burial bed was later dated to the mid-4th century.

2020 pandemic
On 25 March 2020, Israeli health officials ordered the site closed to the public due to the COVID-19 pandemic. According to the keeper of the keys, it was the first such closure since 1349, during the Black Death. Clerics continued regular prayers inside the building, and it reopened to visitors two months later, on 24 May.

2022 renovations 
During church renovations in 2022, a stone slab covered in modern graffiti was moved from a wall, revealing Cosmatesque-style decoration on one face. According to an IAA archaeologist, the decoration was once inlaid with pieces of glass and fine marble; it indicates that the relic was the front of the church's high altar from the Crusader era (c. 1149), which was later used by the Greek Orthodox until being damaged in the 1808 fire.

Description

Parvis (courtyard)

The courtyard facing the entrance to the church is known as the parvis. Two streets open into the parvis: St Helena Road (west) and Suq ed-Dabbagha (east). Around the parvis are a few smaller structures.

South of the parvis, opposite the church:
 Broken columns—once forming part of an arcade—stand opposite the church, at the top of a short descending staircase stretching over the entire breadth of the parvis. In the 13th century, the tops of the columns were removed and sent to Mecca by the Khwarezmids.
 The Gethsemane Metochion, a small Greek Orthodox monastery (metochion).

On the eastern side of the parvis, south to north:
 The Monastery of St Abraham (Greek Orthodox), next to the Suq ed-Dabbagha entrance to the parvis.
 The Chapel of St John the Evangelist (Armenian Orthodox)
 The Chapel of St Michael and the Chapel of the Four Living Creatures (both are disputed between the Copts and Ethiopians), giving access to Deir es-Sultan (also disputed), a rooftop monastery surrounding the dome of the Chapel of St Helena.
North of the parvis, in front of the church façade or against it:
  Chapel of the Franks (Chapel of Our Lady of Sorrows): a blue-domed Roman Catholic Crusader chapel dedicated to Our Lady of Sorrows, which once provided exclusive access to Calvary. The chapel marks the 10th Station of the Cross (the stripping of Jesus's garments).
 Oratory of St. Mary of Egypt: a Greek Orthodox oratory and chapel, directly beneath the Chapel of the Franks, dedicated to St. Mary of Egypt.
 The tomb (including a ledgerstone) of Philip d'Aubigny (Philip Daubeney, died 1236), a knight, tutor, and royal councilor to Henry III of England and signer of the Magna Carta—is placed in front of, and between, the church's two original entrance doors, of which the eastern one is walled up. It is one of the few tombs of crusaders and other Europeans not removed from the Church after the Muslim recapture of Jerusalem in the 12th century.  In the 1900s, during a fight between the Greeks and Latins, some monks damaged the tomb by throwing stones from the roof.  A stone marker was placed on his tomb in 1925, sheltered by a wooden trapdoor that hides it from view.

A group of three chapels borders the parvis on its west side. They originally formed the baptistery complex of the Constantinian church. The southernmost chapel was the vestibule, the middle chapel the baptistery, and the north chapel the chamber in which the patriarch chrismated the newly baptized before leading them into the rotunda north of this complex. Now they are dedicated as (from south to north)
 The Chapel of St. James the Just (Greek Orthodox),
 The Chapel of St. John the Baptist (Greek Orthodox),
 The Chapel of the Forty Martyrs of Sebaste (Greek Orthodox; at the base of the bell tower).

Bell tower
The 12th-century Crusader bell tower is just south of the Rotunda, to the left of the entrance. Its upper level was lost in a 1545 collapse. In 1719, another two storeys were lost.

Façade and entrance
The wooden doors that compose the main entrance are the original, highly carved arched doors. Today, only the left-hand entrance is currently accessible, as the right doorway has long since been bricked up. The entrance to the church leads to the south transept, through the crusader façade in the parvis of a larger courtyard. This is found past a group of streets winding through the outer Via Dolorosa by way of a souq in the Muristan. This narrow way of access to such a large structure has proven to be hazardous at times. For example, when a fire broke out in 1840, dozens of pilgrims were trampled to death.

According to their own family lore, the Muslim Nuseibeh family has been responsible for opening the door as an impartial party to the church's denominations already since the 7th century. However, they themselves admit that the documents held by various Christian denominations only mention their role since the 12th century, in the time of Saladin, which is the date more generally accepted.

The 'immovable ladder' stands beneath a window on the façade.

Calvary (Golgotha)

Just inside the church entrance is a stairway leading up to Calvary (Golgotha), traditionally regarded as the site of Jesus's crucifixion and the most lavishly decorated part of the church. The exit is via another stairway opposite the first, leading down to the ambulatory. Golgotha and its chapels are just south of the main altar of the catholicon.

Calvary is split into two chapels: one Greek Orthodox and one Catholic, each with its own altar. On the left (north) side, the Greek Orthodox chapel's altar is placed over the supposed rock of Calvary (the 12th Station of the Cross), which can be touched through a hole in the floor beneath the altar. The rock can be seen under protective glass on both sides of the altar. The softer surrounding stone was removed when the church was built. The Roman Catholic (Franciscan) Chapel of the Nailing of the Cross (the 11th Station of the Cross) stretches to the south. 
Between the Catholic Altar of the Nailing to the Cross and the Orthodox altar is the Catholic Altar of the Stabat Mater, which has a statue of Mary with an 18th-century bust; this middle altar marks the 13th Station of the Cross.

On the ground floor, just underneath the Golgotha chapel, is the Chapel of Adam. According to tradition, Jesus was crucified over the place where Adam's skull was buried. According to some, the blood of Christ ran down the cross and through the rocks to fill Adam's skull. Through a window at the back of the 11th-century apse, the rock of Calvary can be seen with a crack traditionally held to be caused by the earthquake that followed Jesus's death; some scholars claim it is the result of quarrying against a natural flaw in the rock.

Behind the Chapel of Adam is the Greek Treasury (Treasury of the Greek Patriarch).  Some of its relics, such as a 12th-century crystal mitre, were transferred to the Greek Orthodox Patriarchate Museum (the Patriarchal Museum) on Greek Orthodox Patriarchate Street.

Stone of Anointing

Just inside the entrance to the church is the Stone of Anointing (also Stone of the Anointing or Stone of Unction), which tradition holds to be where Jesus's body was prepared for burial by Joseph of Arimathea, though this tradition is only attested since the crusader era (notably by the Italian Dominican pilgrim Riccoldo da Monte di Croce in 1288), and the present stone was only added in the 1810 reconstruction.

The wall behind the stone is defined by its striking blue balconies and taphos symbol-bearing red banners (depicting the insignia of the Brotherhood of the Holy Sepulchre), and is decorated with lamps. The modern mosaic along the wall depicts the anointing of Jesus's body, preceded on the right by the Descent from the Cross, and succeeded on the left by the Burial of Jesus.

The wall was a temporary addition to support the arch above it, which had been weakened after the damage in the 1808 fire; it blocks the view of the rotunda, separates the entrance from the catholicon, sits on top of four of the now empty and desecrated Crusader graves and is no longer structurally necessary. Opinions differ as to whether it is to be seen as the 13th Station of the Cross, which others identify as the lowering of Jesus from the cross and located between the 11th and 12th stations on Calvary.

The lamps that hang over the Stone of Unction, adorned with cross-bearing chain links, are contributed by Armenians, Copts, Greeks and Latins.

Immediately inside and to the left of the entrance is a bench (formerly a divan) that has traditionally been used by the church's Muslim doorkeepers, along with some Christian clergy, as well as electrical wiring. To the right of the entrance is a wall along the ambulatory containing the staircase leading to Golgotha. Further along the same wall is the entrance to the Chapel of Adam.

Rotunda and Aedicule

The rotunda is the building of the larger dome located on the far west side. In the centre of the rotunda is a small chapel called the Aedicule in English, from the Latin , in reference to a small shrine. The Aedicule has two rooms: the first holds a relic called the Angel's Stone, which is believed to be a fragment of the large stone that sealed the tomb; the second, smaller room contains the tomb of Jesus. Possibly to prevent pilgrims from removing bits of the original rock as souvenirs, by 1555, a surface of marble cladding was placed on the tomb to prevent further damage to the tomb. In October 2016, the top slab was pulled back to reveal an older, partially broken marble slab with a Crusader-style cross carved in it. Beneath it, the limestone burial bed was revealed to be intact.

Under the Status Quo, the Eastern Orthodox, Roman Catholic, and Armenian Apostolic Churches all have rights to the interior of the tomb, and all three communities celebrate the Divine Liturgy or Holy Mass there daily. It is also used for other ceremonies on special occasions, such as the Holy Saturday ceremony of the Holy Fire led by the Greek Orthodox patriarch (with the participation of the Coptic and Armenian patriarchs). To its rear, in the Coptic Chapel, constructed of iron latticework, lies the altar used by the Coptic Orthodox. Historically, the Georgians also retained the key to the Aedicule.

To the right of the sepulchre on the northwestern edge of the Rotunda is the Chapel of the Apparition, which is reserved for Roman Catholic use.

Catholicon

In the central nave of the Crusader-era church, just east of the larger rotunda, is the Crusader structure housing the main altar of the Church, today the Greek Orthodox catholicon.

Since 1996 this dome is topped by the monumental Golgotha Crucifix, which the Greek Patriarch Diodoros I of Jerusalem consecrated. It was at the initiative of Israeli professor Gustav Kühnel to erect a new crucifix at the church that would not only be worthy of the singularity of the site, but that would also become a symbol of the efforts of unity in the community of Christian faith.

The catholicon's iconostasis demarcates the Orthodox sanctuary behind it, to its east.
The iconostasis is flanked to the front by two episcopal thrones: the southern seat (cathedra) is the patriarchal throne of the Greek Orthodox patriarch of Jerusalem, and the northern seat is for an archbishop or bishop. (There is also a popular claim that both are patriarchal thrones, with the northern one being for the patriarch of Antioch — which has been described as a misstatement, however.)

Armenian monastery south of the Aedicule
South of the Aedicule is the "Place of the Three Marys", marked by a stone canopy (the Station of the Holy Women) and a large modern wall mosaic. From here one can enter the Armenian monastery, which stretches over the ground and first upper floor of the church's southeastern part.

Syriac Chapel with Tomb of Joseph of Arimathea
West of the Aedicule, to the rear of the Rotunda, is the Syriac Chapel with the Tomb of Joseph of Arimathea, located in a Constantinian apse and containing an opening to an ancient Jewish rock-cut tomb. This chapel is where the Syriac Orthodox celebrate their Liturgy on Sundays.

The Syriac Orthodox Chapel of Saint Joseph of Arimathea and Saint Nicodemus. On Sundays and feast days it is furnished for the celebration of Mass. It is accessed from the Rotunda, by a door west of the Aedicule.

First-century tomb
On the far side of the chapel is the low entrance to an almost complete first-century Jewish tomb, initially holding six kokh-type funeral shafts radiating from a central chamber, two of which are still exposed. Although this space was discovered relatively recently and contains no identifying marks, some believe that Joseph of Arimathea and Nicodemus were buried here.Since Jews always buried their dead outside the city, the presence of this tomb seems to prove that the Holy Sepulchre site was outside the city walls at the time of the crucifixion.

Franciscan area north of the Aedicule

 The Franciscan Chapel of St. Mary Magdalene – The chapel, an open area, indicates the place where Mary Magdalene met Jesus after his resurrection.
 The Franciscan Chapel of the Apparition (Chapel of the Blessed Sacrament), directly north of the above – in memory of Jesus's meeting with his mother after the Resurrection, a non-scriptural tradition. Here stands a piece of an ancient column, allegedly part of the one Jesus was tied to during his scourging.

Arches of the Virgin

The Arches of the Virgin are seven arches (an arcade) at the northern end of the north transept, which is to the catholicon's north. 
Disputed by the Orthodox and the Latin, the area is used to store ladders.

Prison of Christ

In the northeast side of the complex, there is the Prison of Christ, alleged to be where Jesus was held. The Greek Orthodox are showing pilgrims yet another place where Jesus was allegedly held, the similarly named Prison of Christ in their , located near the Church of Ecce Homo, between the Second and Third Stations of the Via Dolorosa. The Armenians regard a recess in the Monastery of the Flagellation at the Second Station of the Via Dolorosa as the Prison of Christ. A cistern among the ruins beneath the Church of St. Peter in Gallicantu on Mount Zion is also alleged to have been the Prison of Christ. To reconcile the traditions, some allege that Jesus was held in the Mount Zion cell in connection with his trial by the Jewish high priest, at the Praetorium in connection with his trial by the Roman governor Pilate, and near the Golgotha before crucifixion.

Ambulatory
The chapels in the ambulatory are, from north to south: the Greek Chapel of Saint Longinus (named after Longinus), the Armenian Chapel of the Division of Robes, the entrance to the Chapel of Saint Helena, and the Greek Chapel of the Derision.

Chapel of Saint Helena

 Chapel of Saint Helena – between the Chapel of the Division of Robes and the Greek Chapel of the Derision are stairs descending to the Chapel of Saint Helena. The Armenians, who own it, call it the Chapel of St. Gregory the Illuminator, after the saint who brought Christianity to the Armenians.

Chapel of Saint Vartan

 Chapel of St Vartan (or Vardan) Mamikonian – on the north side of the Chapel of Saint Helena is an ornate wrought iron door, beyond which a raised artificial platform affords views of the quarry, and which leads to the Chapel of Saint Vartan. The latter chapel contains archaeological remains from Hadrian's temple and Constantine's basilica. These areas are open only on request.

Chapel of the Invention of the Holy Cross
 Chapel of the Invention of the Cross (named for the Invention (Finding) of the Holy Cross) – another set of 22 stairs from the Chapel of Saint Helena leads down to the Roman Catholic Chapel of the Invention of the Holy Cross, believed to be the place where the True Cross was found.

Status Quo

An Ottoman decree of 1757 helped establish a status quo upholding the state of affairs for various Holy Land sites.
The status quo was upheld in Sultan Abdülmecid I's firman (decree) of 1852/3, which pinned down the now-permanent statutes of property and the regulations concerning the roles of the different denominations and other custodians.

The primary custodians are the Roman Catholic, Greek Orthodox and Armenian Apostolic churches. The Greek Orthodox act through the Greek Orthodox Patriarchate as well as through the Brotherhood of the Holy Sepulchre. Roman Catholics act through the Franciscan Custody of the Holy Land. In the 19th century, the Coptic Orthodox, the Ethiopian Orthodox and the Syriac Orthodox also acquired lesser responsibilities, which include shrines and other structures in and around the building.

None of these controls the main entrance. In 1192, Saladin assigned door-keeping responsibilities to the Muslim Nusaybah family. The wooden doors that compose the main entrance are the original, highly carved doors. The Joudeh al-Goudia (al-Ghodayya) family were entrusted as custodian to the keys of the Holy Sepulchre by Saladin in 1187. Despite occasional disagreements, religious services take place in the Church with regularity and coexistence is generally peaceful. An example of concord between the Church custodians is the full restoration of the Aedicule from 2016 to 2017.

The establishment of the modern Status Quo in 1853 did not halt controversy and occasional violence. 
In 1902, 18 friars were hospitalized and some monks were jailed after the Franciscans and Greeks disagreed over who could clean the lowest step of the Chapel of the Franks. In the aftermath, the Greek patriarch, Franciscan custos, Ottoman governor and French consul general signed a convention that both denominations could sweep it.
On a hot summer day in 2002, a Coptic monk moved his chair from its agreed spot into the shade. This was interpreted as a hostile move by the Ethiopians and eleven were hospitalized after the resulting fracas. In another incident in 2004, during Orthodox celebrations of the Exaltation of the Holy Cross, a door to the Franciscan chapel was left open. This was taken as a sign of disrespect by the Orthodox and a fistfight broke out. Some people were arrested, but no one was seriously injured.

On Palm Sunday, in April 2008, a brawl broke out when a Greek monk was ejected from the building by a rival faction. Police were called to the scene but were also attacked by the enraged brawlers. On Sunday, 9 November 2008, a clash erupted between Armenian and Greek monks during celebrations for the Feast of the Cross.

2018 tax/land affair 

In February 2018, the church was closed following a tax dispute over 152 million euros of uncollected taxes on church properties. The city hall stressed that the Church of the Holy Sepulchre and all other churches are exempt from the taxes, with the changes only affecting establishments like "hotels, halls and businesses" owned by the churches. NPR had reported that the Greek Orthodox Church calls itself the second-largest landowner in Israel, after the Israeli government.

There was a lock-in protest against an Israeli legislative proposal which would expropriate church lands that had been sold to private companies since 2010, a measure which church leaders assert constitutes a serious violation of their property rights and the Status Quo. In a joint official statement the church authorities protested what they considered to be the peak of a systematic campaign in:
a discriminatory and racist bill that targets solely the properties of the Christian community in the Holy Land ... This reminds us all of laws of a similar nature which were enacted against the Jews during dark periods in Europe.

The 2018 taxation affair does not cover any church buildings or religious related facilities (because they are exempt by law), but commercial facilities such as the Notre Dame Hotel which was not paying the arnona tax, and any land which is owned and used as a commercial land. The church holds the rights to land where private homes have been constructed, and some of the disagreement had been raised after the Knesset had proposed a bill that will make it harder for a private company not to extend a lease for land used by homeowners. The church leaders have said that such a bill will make it harder for them to sell church-owned lands. According to The Jerusalem Post:
The stated aim of the bill is to protect homeowners against the possibility that private companies will not extend their leases of land on which their houses or apartments stand.

In June 2019, a number of Christian denominations in Jerusalem raised their voice against the Supreme Court's decision to uphold the sale of three properties by the Greek Orthodox Patriarchate to Ateret Cohanim – an organization that seeks to increase the number of Jews in Jerusalem. The church leaders warned that if the organization gets the access to control the sites, Christians will lose access to the Church of the Holy Sepulchre.

Connection to Roman temple

The site of the church had been a temple to Jupiter or Venus built by Hadrian before Constantine's edifice was built. Hadrian's temple had been located there because it was the junction of the main north–south road with one of the two main east–west roads and directly adjacent to the forum (now the location of the Muristan, which is smaller than the former forum). The forum itself had been placed, as is traditional in Roman towns, at the junction of the main north–south road with the other main east–west road (which is now El-Bazar/David Street). The temple and forum together took up the entire space between the two main east–west roads (a few above-ground remains of the east end of the temple precinct still survive in the Alexander Nevsky Church complex of the Russian Mission in Exile).

From the archaeological excavations in the 1970s, it is clear that construction took over most of the site of the earlier temple enclosure and that the Triportico and Rotunda roughly overlapped with the temple building itself; the excavations indicate that the temple extended at least as far back as the Aedicule, and the temple enclosure would have reached back slightly further. Virgilio Canio Corbo, a Franciscan priest and archaeologist, who was present at the excavations, estimated from the archaeological evidence that the western retaining wall of the temple itself would have passed extremely close to the east side of the supposed tomb; if the wall had been any further west any tomb would have been crushed under the weight of the wall (which would be immediately above it) if it had not already been destroyed when foundations for the wall were made.

Other archaeologists have criticized Corbo's reconstructions. Dan Bahat, the former city archaeologist of Jerusalem, regards them as unsatisfactory, as there is no known temple of Aphrodite (Venus) matching Corbo's design, and no archaeological evidence for Corbo's suggestion that the temple building was on a platform raised high enough to avoid including anything sited where the Aedicule is now; indeed Bahat notes that many temples to Aphrodite have a rotunda-like design, and argues that there is no archaeological reason to assume that the present rotunda was not based on a rotunda in the temple previously on the site.

Location

The New Testament describes Jesus's tomb as being outside the city wall, as was normal for burials across the ancient world, which were regarded as unclean. Today, the site of the Church is within the current walls of the old city of Jerusalem. It has been well documented by archaeologists that in the time of Jesus, the walled city was smaller and the wall then was to the east of the current site of the Church. In other words, the city had been much narrower in Jesus's time, with the site then having been outside the walls; since Herod Agrippa (41–44) is recorded by history as extending the city to the north (beyond the present northern walls), the required repositioning of the western wall is traditionally attributed to him as well.

The area immediately to the south and east of the sepulchre was a quarry and outside the city during the early first century as excavations under the Lutheran Church of the Redeemer across the street demonstrated.

The church is a part of the UNESCO World Heritage Site Old City of Jerusalem.

The Christian Quarter and the (also Christian) Armenian Quarter of the Old City of Jerusalem are both located in the northwestern and western part of the Old City, due to the fact that the Holy Sepulchre is located close to the northwestern corner of the walled city. The adjacent neighbourhood within the Christian Quarter is called the Muristan, a term derived from the Persian word for hospital – Christian pilgrim hospices have been maintained in this area near the Holy Sepulchre since at least the time of Charlemagne.

Influence
From the 9th century onward, the construction of churches inspired by the Anastasis was extended across Europe. One example is Santo Stefano in Bologna, Italy, an agglomeration of seven churches recreating shrines of Jerusalem.

Several churches and monasteries in Europe, for instance, in Germany and Russia, and at least one church in the United States have been wholly or partially modeled on the Church of the Resurrection, some even reproducing other holy places for the benefit of pilgrims who could not travel to the Holy Land.

Author Andrew Holt writes that the church is the most important in all Christendom.

See also

 Burial places of founders of world religions
 Canons Regular of the Holy Sepulchre
 , leader of the 1961-1977 excavations
 Christianity in Israel
 Early Christian art and architecture
 Fathers of the Holy Sepulchre
 The Garden Tomb
 Hashemite custodianship of Jerusalem holy sites
 History of Roman and Byzantine domes
 History of medieval Arabic and Western European domes
 List of oldest church buildings
 Monza ampullae
 Mosque of Omar (Jerusalem)
 Palestinian Christians
 Talpiot Tomb

References
Footnotes

Citations

Sources

Further reading

 
 
 
 
 
 
  This also contains a detailed summary of the then-current theories as to the location of the tomb, with an extensive bibliography.

External links

 The Holy Sepulchre in Jerusalem (article and photos)
 Homily of John Paul II in the Church of the Holy Sepulchre
 OrthodoxWiki (article)
 Sacred Destinations (article, interactive plan, photo gallery)
Map of the Church of the Holy Sepulchre, 1715, by Nicolas de Fer. Eran Laor Cartographic Collection, National Library of Israel

Custodians
The Brotherhood of the Holy Sepulchre (Greek Orthodox custodians)
Franciscan Custody in the Holy Land (Roman Catholic custodians)
 The Joudeh family (Muslim custodian of the keys of the Holy Sepulchre)
 Nuseibeh family (Muslim Holy Sepulchre door keepers)
St. James Brotherhood (Armenian custodians)

Virtual tours
 Church of the Holy Sepulchre Virtual Tour
 The Holy Sepulchre Virtual Tour

 
4th-century churches
Buildings and structures completed in 1149
12th-century churches
Buildings and structures completed in 1555
Buildings and structures completed in 1809
Alleged tombs of Jesus
Ancient churches in the Holy Land
Armenian Apostolic churches in Jerusalem
Basilica churches in Jerusalem
Christian pilgrimage sites
Relics associated with Jesus
Constantine the Great and Christianity
Crusade places
Church buildings with domes
Eastern Orthodox church buildings in Jerusalem
4th-century establishments in the Byzantine Empire
Greek Orthodox churches in Israel
Resurrection of Jesus
Round churches
Articles containing video clips
Christian Quarter
Roman Catholic churches in Jerusalem
Ethiopian Orthodox Tewahedo churches in Jerusalem
Coptic Orthodox Churches in Jerusalem
Syriac Orthodox churches in Jerusalem
Crusader churches
Status quo holy places
Calvary
Tombs in Israel
Ministry of Endowments and Islamic Affairs (Jordan)
Baroque architecture in the Ottoman Empire